Pierre Grégoire (9 November 1907 – 8 April 1991) was a Luxembourgish politician in the Christian Social People's Party (CSV), journalist, and writer.  Before turning to politics full-time, he wrote for the Luxemburger Wort newspaper.

Before World War II, he organised the development of the CSV's precursor, the Party of the Right, along with Jean Baptiste Esch. He was a CSV Deputy from 1946 onwards, and was the party's secretary-general from 1952 to 1960. He was a member of the Council of Europe from 1956.

He also held several government posts: he was the minister for the Interior, Religion, Arts and Sciences and Transport from 1959 to 1964, then became minister for Cultural Affairs, Education and the Civil Service from 1964 onwards. From 1969 to 1974 he was the president of the Chamber of Deputies.

External links 
 

|-

|-

|-

|-

Ministers for Transport of Luxembourg
Ministers for Defence of Luxembourg
Ministers for Foreign Affairs of Luxembourg
Presidents of the Chamber of Deputies (Luxembourg)
Members of the Chamber of Deputies (Luxembourg)
Christian Social People's Party politicians
Luxembourgian journalists
Male journalists
Luxembourgian non-fiction writers
Luxemburger Wort people
1907 births
1991 deaths
Vichten
Alumni of the Athénée de Luxembourg
20th-century journalists